Mylène Farmer en concert is Mylène Farmer's 1989 concert tour in support of her second studio album, Ainsi soit je.... It was the first tour of the singer.

Introduction 

In 1989, five years had passed since the first hit of Farmer ("Maman a tort" in 1984), and other successful songs had crowned the singer's career. However, she always sang in play-back when she was invited on television (she only performed live - with difficulty - "Tristana" on La Nouvelle Affiche, on April 1, 1987). As a result, some people believed that Farmer was not a real singer. Thus, to prove her talent to her critics, Farmer scheduled a series of concerts for May 1989 in Saint-Étienne and at the Palais des Sports (Paris) for a total of nine shows. According to Sophie Tellier, one of the dancers, Farmer thought at the beginning that she would never be able to go on stage, and then she saw this tour as an "incredible challenge". Farmer admitted that she knew before her tour that she would be the subject of criticisms, and is why she got ready physically and artistically with a great perfectionism. She chose the Palais des Sports, because she explained that she "hated the intimate places" that "prevented her from finding pleasure" and that she needed big spaces. In October, she revealed that she will perform 16 songs on stage.

Every effort was made by Farmer and Boutonnat so that this concert would be huge, whether it is at the level of the stage set, the music, special effects, choreographies... As these concerts were "a real triumph" (all available tickets were sold), a tour was scheduled adding 44 shows mainly across France, but also Switzerland and Belgium. Because of the smallness of some concert halls and the enormous size of the stage set, several shows were forced to be cancelled. Other shows were postponed (for example, the concerts in Valence and Sanary were postponed on October 16 for technical reasons). All the concert halls were full every evening. Farmer was also the first French female singer to sing in the great hall of the Palais omnisports de Paris-Bercy.

Before going on stage, Farmer had an intensive athletic training including running (5 km per day), physical and breathing exercises, and was on a diet (she had even stopped smoking). She also took singing lessons. In an interview, she said about the concert : "I really eagerly awaited the moment to try this experiment. Today, I want to go there. I feel I'm able to do it. A second round is beginning. (...) I don't want an intimate concert hall. I need wide open spaces, a breath." She confessed that she was anxious at the idea of singing on stage and that she didn't manage to sleep because of that. However, she considered this show as "an immense pleasure".

Thierry Rogen, who has been involved in the elaboration of the show, said in an interview that this concert was "one of [the] most beautiful professional experiences, but at the same time one of [the] worst". According to him, preparations for the concert were very difficult, because Farmer and Boutonnat had a high level of professionalism and they wanted to produce a great spectacle. He explained: "We [Farmer's team] were scared until the end to not be up to the task. (...) We were the first to put synths and movies on stage, with a technology that was not so sophisticated as it is today (...). Mylène's discs were so sophisticated in the production that we could not go on stage and just put a drummer, a bass player and a guitarist. It needed that the audience find again on stage the color of albums which contained multiple sequences and programming. Therefore, in addition to the vocalists and Mylène on stage, there were also some backings, which included footage of voices. Perhaps it is this that has led criticism, because some people said that the sound was too great to emerge only from the stage." He confirmed then that Farmer had never sung in playback during this tour.

The basis idea of the stage set was "the passage of time". Boutonnat and Farmer wanted to create "a little gothic atmosphere, mixing mysterious, deep and old things", connected to the psychoanalysis. All should be "both thoughtless and strong". Finally, a cemetery was chosen by the singer to frame her show and "her arrival on the stage resembled that of a ghost coming out of a tomb". Indeed, the atmosphere of these concerts was rather sad and cold. White and black were the dominant colors of the show. The transport and the assembly of the stage necessitated enormous technical means. Spectators were not allowed to photograph the singer or the stage, because an agency was specially in charge of this work.

After the first shows, Farmer said that through these concerts, she was able for the first time in her life to have confidence in herself.

Critical reception

Negatives comments

 The lack of talent

About the concert in Lausanne, a critical article published in Le Matin, with headline "A dish for nothing - (...) When the futile attached to the unnecessary and unpleasant", said: "There was in this concert no emotion". It described the musical performance as an "indescribable resonant cacophony" and considered that the choreographies were "a nullity having equalled only by the stupidity". Highly critical, Le Parisien held that "this show mixes all the clichés from across the Atlantic, spiced with a local pseudo-culture that confuses 'spectacular' and 'ocular spectrum'". The article stated : "It is well done, without a soul, but without vulgarity. Icy, but colossal". It qualified Farmer's performance with words such as "poor swaying hips", "streak of voice" and "neurotic look". It concluded by saying that this show "does not bring pleasure, nor happiness" nor "talent" and it is a "swindle".

 The lack of emotion and a sad ambiance

Several press articles criticized the show for a lack of emotion or spontaneity. Télé Moustique concluded that, in spite of a "redoubtable professionalism", the production is "rigorous", "without any commitment, without endangering which makes shiver". Very critical, an article published in L'Humanité considered the concert as "impeccable", but the lack of spontaneity in the show leads the author to conclude that "Farmer takes the mickey out of her public". An Alsatian newspaper described the concert as "prefabricated" (some people who attended the show criticized this analysis). La Nouvelle République du Centre described the concert in Poitiers as being "satanic, grand, perverse, (...) sulphurous, fascinating, on the verge of the uneasiness".

 The lack of dialogue with the audience

According to a press article, what "has failed the most to this performance is generosity". Indeed, except a 'good evening' and a 'thank you', Farmer didn't speak to her audience and according to this article it is possible to "wonder where the love comes from the public for a too cold" singer. In the same way, while Le Dauphiné libéré admitted that the show was "perfect", it criticized the "contact with the audience [which] was disappointing".

 The too loud sound system

Many critics blamed the show for its too loud music. For example, an article underlined "the profusion of special effects, a grandiloquent stage setting", but also "a high-powered and often rough sound system", concluding : "Everything for the eye, nothing for the ears". Another article declared that Farmer had taken care of the visual aspect of her show, with original choreographies, but that what she had sung was not very audible. L'Echo du Centre recognized that "choreographies were remarkable and perfectly adjusted", but expressed a regret about the sound system. La Dépêche du Midi asserted that, "in spite of a so little acoustic and too synthetic music", Farmer "pulled through with the honors". La Libre Belgique considered that the "intrusive" sound system which "prevents from understanding texts", is perhaps "the main criticism" against this show, adding that Farmer "has a voice, some charm and the talent", but that the concert "misses improvisation and dialogue". In the same way, Le Provençal said :"The sound saturated by instruments leaves only a tiny space to the small vocal cords" of Farmer. Figaroscope said that "Farmer disappointed by her repeated absences [on stage] and a sound system (...) grinding her fragile organ". As for Le Courrier picard, it described as "errors of course" the "blaring sound system" and the "blinding lights" and predicted that Farmer would not perform other tours after that one.

Positive reviews

 The talent of Farmer

Conversely, certain media praised the talent of the singer. About one of the first shows at the Palais des Sports, France Soir said: "Her show, rhythmic and very calibrated in the fantasized register that she likes, is that of a real professional", with a "fine gesture". Var Matin stated : Farmer's work "almost reaches the perfection" and "combines grace to quality". About the performance in Lausanne, a Swiss newspaper said that the show was "beautiful" and Farmer made a "real professional work". Le Dauphiné said that Farmer "has the necessary scale to compete with the sense of the show which the Americans have". Lyon Figaro considered that the show in Lyon "splendidly demonstrated the supremacy of the singer on the French market". According to L'Est Républicain, after her concerts of May in Paris, Farmer proved that "she was intended for the stage" and that her performances are able to "silence her last critics". After the performance in Fréjus, Var Matin said that, in a "mystic atmosphere", Farmer "gave all the measure of her talent".

 The greatness of the show

Podium described this show as "a memorable concert", with its "naughty choreography", "exquisite staging" and "luxurious costumes". The article stated : "Mylène Farmer on stage, it is a real videoclip in three dimensions, the fury and emotion at the power ten (...), a festival of strong images". According to a Swiss newspaper, "the audience was not disappointed. (...) No place is conceded to improvisation, the songs are refined in the extreme". France Soir declared that the concert in Saint-Étienne was "fascinating" and "magical". Sud Ouest stated that the show is "well conceived", "every song is highlighted by an original stage setting and choreography", with "beautiful costumes and perfect lighting effects". It also qualified the show as a "big spectacle", in which "the choreography looks like ballets". According to L'Alsace and L'Express, "the show kept its promises" and was a "total triumph". La Montagne stated : "The surprise came from the real visual show, magnificently settled. (...) The work on the lightings and the stage setting is the sign of the very great class". Le Méridional qualified this concert as "bewitching".

Commercial success

For only the concerts at Paris-Bercy (two shows), 35,000 tickets were sold in a very short time (five weeks). 40,000 people attended her single concert in Brussels, 4,000 in Grenoble, 5,000 in Fréjus, 14,000 in Lyon, 7,500 in Lausanne, 2,500 in Rennes, 6,000 in Lievin, 6,000 in Nantes, 3,500 in Mulhouse, 2,500 in Strasbourg. According to Farmer, approximately 7,000 people attended each of her shows.

This tour was one of the more imposing in France at that time: indeed, it cost over 40 million francs and more than 300,000 people were at this tour. For this tour, there were eight dancers, seven musicians, three singers, 50 technicians, five trucks and 38 tons of equipment.

Through her successful concerts at Bercy, Farmer "demonstrated that she had become one of the largest [stars]".

Set list

Tour dates

There were a total of 52 shows, from May 11 to December 8, 1989, in three countries (France, Belgium, Switzerland):

{| class="wikitable" style="text-align:center;"
! width="150"| Date
! width="150"| City
! width="150"| Country
! width="200"| Venue
! width="75"| Refs
|-
|May 11, 1989
|Saint-Étienne
|rowspan="23"|France
|Palais des Sports
|
|-
|May 18, 1989
|rowspan="8"|Paris
|rowspan="8"|Palais des Sports
|rowspan="8"|
|-
|May 19, 1989
|-
|May 20, 1989
|-
|May 21, 1989
|-
|May 22, 1989
|-
|May 23, 1989
|-
|May 24, 1989
|-
|May 25, 1989
|-
|September 19, 1989
|Grenoble
|Summum
|
|-
|September 21, 1989
|Valence
|Mammouth, Granges-lès-Valence Cancelled
|
|-
|September 22, 1989
|Dijon
|Palais des Sports Cancelled
|
|-
|September 23, 1989
|Fréjus
|Arènes Romaines
|
|-
|September 24, 1989
|Avignon
|Parc des Expositions
|
|-
|September 26, 1989
|Sanary-sur-Mer
|Esplanade de la mer Cancelled
|
|-
|September 29, 1989
|Montpellier
|Le Zénith
|
|-
|September 30, 1989
|rowspan="2"|Toulouse
|rowspan="2"|Palais des Sports
|
|-
|October 1, 1989
|-
|October 6, 1989
|Limoges
|Palais des Sports et des Fêtes
|
|-
|October 7, 1989
|Montluçon
|Athanor
|
|-
|October 8, 1989
|Le Mans
|La Rotonde
|
|-
|October 10, 1989
|Lyon
|Halle Tony Garnier
|
|-
|October 11, 1989
|Clermont Ferrand
|Maison des Sports
|
|-
|October 13, 1989
|Lausanne
|Switzerland
|Palais de Beaulieu
|
|-
|October 14, 1989
|Annecy
|rowspan="3"|France
|Place des Romains
|
|-
|October 16, 1989
|Sanary
|Esplanade de la mer Cancelled
|
|-
|October 18, 1989
|Rennes
|Salle omnisports
|
|-  
|October 20, 1989
|rowspan="2"|Brussels
|rowspan="2"|Belgium
|rowspan="2"|Forest National
|rowspan="2"|
|-
|October 21, 1989
|-
|October 24, 1989
|Bordeaux
|rowspan="28"|France
|Patinoire Meriadeck
|
|-
|October 25, 1989
|Angers
|Parc des Expositions
|
|-
|October 27, 1989
|Poitiers
|Arènes
|
|-
|October 28, 1989
|Pau
|Foire-Expo
|
|-
|November 4, 1989
|rowspan="2"|Valence
|Mammouth, Granges-lès-ValenceOriginally scheduled on September 21
|
|-
|November 6, 1989
|Mammouth, Granges-lès-Valence
|
|-
|November 8, 1989
|Chartres
|Chartrexpo Cancelled
|
|-
|November 10, 1989
|Lorient
|Parc des Expositions, Lann-Sévelin
|
|-
|November 11, 1989
|Tours
|Parc-Expo, Rochepinard
|
|-
|November 14, 1989
|Perpignan
|Palais des Expositions Cancelled
|
|-
|November 15, 1989
|Sanary-sur-Mer
|Esplanade de la mer
| 
|-
|November 16, 1989
|Marseille
|Palais des Sports
| 
|-
|November 17, 1989
|Bourg-en-Bresse
|
|
|-
|November 20, 1989
|Caen
|Parc des Expositions
|
|-
|November 21, 1989
|Reims
|Parc des Expositions
|
|-
|November 22, 1989
|Besançon
|Palais des Sports
|
|-
|November 24, 1989
|Lons-le-Saunier
|
|
|-
|November 25, 1989
|Metz 
|Parc des Expositions
|
|-
|November 26, 1989
|Lieven
|Lieven
|
|-
|November 28, 1989
|Montbéliard
|Parc des Loisirs de Voujeaucourt Cancelled
|<ref>'Le Pays, November 1989, Mylène Farmer ne viendra pas à Voujeaucourt" Devant-soi.com (Retrieved March 31, 2008)</ref>
|-
|November 29, 1989
|Épinal 
|Parc des Expositions Cancelled
|La Liberté de l'Est, November 1, 1989 Devant-soi.com (Retrieved March 30, 2008)
|-
|December 1, 1989
|Rouen 
|Parc des Expositions
|
|-
|December 2, 1989
|Nantes 
|La Beaujoire
|Ouest France, November 29, 1989, "Samedi à la Beaujoire : Mylène Farmer" Devant-soi.com (Retrieved March 31, 2008)
|-
|December 3, 1989
|Amiens 
|Centre d'Expositions et de Congrès
|
|-
|December 5, 1989
|Mulhouse 
|Palais des Sports
|L'Alsace, December 5, 1989, "Mylène Farmer sans contrefaçon" Devant-soi.com (Retrieved March 30, 2008)
|-
|December 6, 1989
|Strasbourg 
|Rhénus
|
|-
|December 7, 1989
|rowspan="2"|Paris
|rowspan="2"|Palais omnisports de Paris-Bercy
|rowspan="2"|L'Express, December 1, 1989 Devant-soi.com (Retrieved March 30, 2008)
|-
|December 8, 1989
|}

Further reading
 Julien Wagner, Jean-François Kowalski, Marianne Rosenstiehl, Claude Gassian, Mylène Farmer : Belle de scène'' (book on Farmer's tours), K&B Ed, 27 April 2007

References

1989 concert tours
Mylène Farmer concert tours